Dark side, Dark Side, or Darkside may refer to:

Popular culture
 Dark side (Star Wars), the dark side of the Force in the Star Wars universe
 Dark Side (video game), a 1988 video game from Incentive Software
 The Dark Side (book), a 2008 book by Jane Mayer
 The Dark Side (magazine), a UK horror film publication
 Darkside (novel), a 2007 children's novel by Tom Becker
 Darkside, a horror novel by Dennis Etchison
 Darkside (radio play), a 2013 drama by Tom Stoppard, based on Pink Floyd's album The Dark Side of the Moon
 Darkside, Scottish professional wrestler known for winning the ICW World Heavyweight Championship (Scotland)

Music 
 Darkside (band), an American electronica duo
 The Darkside (band), a British indie band
 Darkside, a subgenre of grime
 Darkside, UK Hardcore Techno event, established in 1999 as part of Twisted Events

Albums 
 The Dark Side (DarkSun album), 2007
 The Dark Side (Gregorian album), 2004
 Darkside (Necrophobic album), 1997
 Darkside (Tim Minchin album), 2005
 Darkside / Stay Awake or the title song, an EP by Kisschasy, 2004
 The Darkside Vol. 1, by Fat Joe, 2010
 The Darkside Vol. 2, by Fat Joe, 2011
 The Darkside III, by Fat Joe, 2013
 The Dark Sides, by King Diamond, 1988
 No More Heroes Sound Tracks: Dark Side, from the video game No More Heroes, 2008
 "The Dark Side", disc one of the Dream Theater album  Greatest Hit (...And 21 Other Pretty Cool Songs), 2008

Songs ("(The) Dark Side") 
 "Dark Side" (Blind Channel song), 2021
"Dark Side" (Kelly Clarkson song), 2012
 "Dark Side" (Phoebe Ryan song), 2017
 "Dark Side" (R5 song), 2016
 "The Dark Side" (song), by Muse, 2018
 "Dark Side", by Erich Church from The Outsiders, 2014
 "Dark Side", by The Shadows of Knight, 1966

Songs ("Darkside") 
"Darkside" (Alan Walker song), 2018
"Darkside" (Blink-182 song), 2019
"Darkside", by Lil Wayne from Funeral, 2020
 "Darkside", by Lindsey Stirling from Artemis, 2019
"Darkside", by Shinedown from Attention Attention, 2018
 "Darkside", by Ty Dolla Sign and Future from Bright: The Album, 2017

Other uses
 DarkSide (dark matter experiment), an affiliation of physicists searching for dark matter
 DarkSide (hacker group), a hacking group responsible for ransomware attacks.
 The night portion of a planetary body, defined by the terminator line

See also
 Darksyde, a ship in the Beast Wars television series
 Darkseid, a DC Comics supervillain
 Dark Side of the Moon (disambiguation)
 The Dark Side of the Sun (disambiguation)
 
 
 
 
 The Bright Side (disambiguation)
 Light side (disambiguation)
 Shadyside (disambiguation)